In tennis history there have been a number of notable rivalries. This is a list of some of the greatest rivalries. 

For the pre-1991 eras, complete statistics on all matches is difficult to obtain in definitive form. In many years there were significant numbers of minor events and exhibition matches outside the designated tours, some of which were not reported in newspapers or recorded by the respective amateur or professional tour management. The approximate nature of these results should be understood and kept in mind while reading this data.

For the purpose of this article only, the criteria for inclusion are (all must be met):

 Both players must have a career high ranking of world No. 3 or better, and at least one of them must have reached No. 1.
 Both must have met multiple times in semi-final or final stages of Grand Slam events (or Pro Slam and also WCCC and WHCC count).
 At least twelve of the career match-ups between them must be in main (regular) tour or circuit series of tournaments.

Men

Amateur Era (including pros)

Open Era 

* Including walkovers or abandoned matches (not counted in head to heads, same as the official ATP head to heads).

Women

Amateur Era

Open Era 

≈ minimum confirmed (early records are incomplete)

See also 
 List of sports rivalries
 Big Three (tennis)

References 

 
rivalries